Bollano is a surname. Notable people with the surname include:

 Angelo Bollano (1918–1978), Italian footballer
 Vasil Bollano (born 1958), Albanian politician, chairman of Omonoia

See also
 Bollani
 Bolano
 Bolaño (disambiguation)